The 2005 Women's Dunlop British Open Squash Championships was held at the National Squash Centre in Manchester from 9–17 October 2005. The event was won by Nicol David who defeated Natalie Grinham in the final.

Seeds

Draw and results

First qualifying round

 Rebecca Chiu withdrew.

Second qualifying round

Final qualifying round

Lucky loser*

First round

 Jenny Tranfield withdrew.

Quarter-finals

Semi-finals

Final

References

Women's British Open Squash Championships
Squash in England
Sports competitions in Manchester
Women's British Open Squash Championship
2000s in Manchester
Women's British Open Squash Championship
British Open Squash Championship
Women's British Open Squash Championship